Jayena is a municipality located in the province of Granada, Spain. According to the 2005 census (INE), the city has a population of 1237 inhabitants.

The village is just north of the Sierras of Tejeda, Almijara and Alhama Natural Park.

During the Andalusian earthquake of 25 December 1884 more than 58% of the houses were destroyed, and the rest were badly damaged. 
10 to 11 deaths were reported, a number that later rose to 17, and 18 were seriously injured. 
87 aftershocks were felt from December 25, 1884 to January 16, 1885.

References

Municipalities in the Province of Granada